Meschak Elia (born 6 August 1997) is a Congolese professional footballer who plays as a forward for Swiss Super League club Young Boys and the DR Congo national team.

Club career
In July 2019 it was announced that Elia would sign for Belgian First Division A club Anderlecht. He, however, disappeared and allegedly falsified his year of birth, which resulted in a 12-month ban by the Congolese Association Football Federation. In February 2020, FIFA "provisionally cleared" Elia to play again and he signed for Swiss Super League side BSC Young Boys.

International career

International goals
Scores and results list DR Congo's goal tally first, score column indicates score after each Elia goal.

Honours 
TP Mazembe
CAF Super Cup: 2016
CAF Confederation Cup: 2016, 2017
 Linafoot: 2015–16, 2016-17

Young Boys
 Swiss Super League: 2019–20
 Swiss Cup: 2019–20

DR Congo
African Nations Championship: 2016

References

External links 
 

1997 births
Living people
Footballers from Kinshasa
Democratic Republic of the Congo footballers
Association football forwards
Democratic Republic of the Congo international footballers
2019 Africa Cup of Nations players
Swiss Super League players
CS Don Bosco players
TP Mazembe players
BSC Young Boys players
Democratic Republic of the Congo A' international footballers
2016 African Nations Championship players
Democratic Republic of the Congo expatriate footballers
Democratic Republic of the Congo expatriate sportspeople in Switzerland
Expatriate footballers in Switzerland